One China, Many Paths, edited by Chaohua Wang.  A collection of essays by Chinese thinkers, reflecting the new thinking that developed in the 1990s.  Both Chinese liberal and Chinese New Left views are represented, along with some views that do not fit either category.

Further reading 
 Book review:

References

External links
Book review by Ban Wang
Review in Foreign Affairs journal
Book review

2005 non-fiction books
2005 anthologies
Essay anthologies
Chinese New Left
Books about politics of China
Liberalism in China